U.N.C.L.E. is an acronym for the fictional United Network Command for Law and Enforcement, a secret international intelligence agency featured in the 1960s American television series The Man from U.N.C.L.E. and The Girl from U.N.C.L.E..

U.N.C.L.E. is an organization consisting of agents of all nationalities. Responsible for "maintaining political and legal order anywhere in the world", it is multinational in makeup and international in scope, protecting and defending nations regardless of size or political persuasion. U.N.C.L.E. operates in Communist and Third World countries the same way that it does in the Western nations.  In the episode entitled "The Shark Affair," (episode 4 from season 1, from 1964) enforcement agent of U.N.C.L.E. Napoleon Solo reveals that U.N.C.L.E. is sponsored by the US, the Soviet Union, the United Kingdom, the Netherlands, Greece, Spain, Italy and Yugoslavia.  Its primary opponent is the independent international criminal organization, THRUSH (Technological Hierarchy for the Removal of Undesirables and the Subjugation of Humanity).

Headquarters
U.N.C.L.E. headquarters is in New York City near the lower
East 40's United Nations.

U.N.C.L.E. headquarters has four levels: one ground level; two higher levels (Waverly's office is on the top floor) and one sub-level. The roof has radar, a laser beam weapon, a helipad and communication antennas, disguised as billboards, that have a worldwide reach. Below the sub-level, there is an underground docking area and a tunnel that runs under the United Nations headquarters giving U.N.C.L.E.'s boats access to the East River.

The headquarters is designed as a fortress hidden in the center of a block of buildings with Brownstone apartments serving as the exterior facade. On one end of the block there is a public parking garage (complete with machine gun bays hidden in the ceiling). On the other end there is a three-story whitestone building. The first and second floors of the whitestone are occupied by The Masque Club, a private, members-only "key club" (like the Playboy Club) in which the waitresses wear masks. On the third floor there are offices of U.N.C.L.E.'s propaganda front, a charity fundraising organization.

There are four primary entrances to U.N.C.L.E. headquarters. In the daytime, field agents are admitted by way of Del Floria's, a small, nondescript tailor/dry-cleaning shop located one flight below street level. The agents go to the single fitting booth and turn the coat hook on the back wall. Outside in the shop, an operator activates a mechanism on the pressing machine that releases the disguised armored door. The wall swings inward and an agent finds him/herself in the main admissions area. There, a receptionist pins on a security badge (white or later, yellow for highest security clearance; red and green for low clearance and visitors). A chemical on the receptionist's fingers activates the badge. There are also entrances through the Men's and Women's lockers at the rear of the parking garage (admissions for non-field personnel). After hours, when Del Floria's is closed, agents may also enter through the Masque Club or through the offices of the charitable organization.

Although in theory the location of U.N.C.L.E.'s New York headquarters is supposed to be secret, the very first episode of the series, "The Vulcan Affair",  demonstrated that it was a poorly-kept secret, at best, as the very teaser of that episode shows THRUSH operatives infiltrating U.N.C.L.E. headquarters through Del Floria's entrance in an attempt to mount an armed assault and kill U.N.C.L.E.'s Section One, Number 1, Mr. Waverly. Other episodes showing THRUSH's knowledge of the location of U.N.C.L.E. headquarters include "The Deadly Games Affair", "The Deadly Decoy Affair" and "The Mad Mad Tea Party Affair" (all first-season episodes). In "The Deadly Decoy Affair", the Del Floria entrance is even used for egress during a high-profile prisoner transfer during daylight hours.  Although, as noted in "The Double Affair" and other episodes, THRUSH has a very effective intelligence service and has also, as demonstrated in "The Mad, Mad Tea Party Affair" successfully corrupted U.N.C.L.E. personnel, or infiltrated their own as moles.

The New York office is but one of several located around the world—and some also use the Del Floria tailor shop as a front (as seen, for example, with U.N.C.L.E.'s Italian headquarters in "The King of Knaves Affair").

Logo

The official logo of the organization is a black Nicolosi-projection globe with some lines of longitude and latitude picked out in white. Black concentric rings surround the globe; to the right of it is the black silhouette of a man in a black suit holding a gun at his side, and a black band beneath the globe and the man features the name "U.N.C.L.E." in the "Decorated 035" font. The logo is normally superimposed on a Mercator-style map of the world—yellow-brown continents with no country borders (a tribute to the one-world philosophy of U.N.C.L.E.) and blue seas—but is also used plain or with tones inverted on official U.N.C.L.E. documents.

Structure
U.N.C.L.E. is subdivided into eight sections, though six of these have overlapping areas of responsibility:

Section I: Policy and Operations
This is the administrative branch. It contains the five chiefs of U.N.C.L.E. as well as all sector and station chiefs. There is a conference for everyone in this section yearly as well as an annual meeting of the five chiefs alone.

The five chiefs administer the business of U.N.C.L.E. from five regional offices that correspond loosely (but not exactly – there is overlap) to the five major continents. The five offices are: New York, Caracas, Nairobi, New Delhi and Berlin. Alexander Waverly designated as "Number One, Section One" and is in charge of U.N.C.L.E.'s New York headquarters. However, in the season one episode "The Brain Killer Affair", under T.H.R.U.S.H. mind control, Mr. Waverly states that the home address of one of the other four chiefs was in France. (At the end of the episode he says he was programmed to impart false information when under the influence of drugs. So the French address was a purposeful deception, not a plot lapse.)

Section II: Operations and Enforcement
This is the section that contains the field agents like Napoleon Solo and Illya Kuryakin.  Solo is assigned to Section Two, Number One and is U.N.C.L.E.'s Chief Enforcement Agent. Illya Kuryakin is appointed Section Two Number Two and operates out of the New York office. Waverly sometimes worries that Solo "will not be with us very long", which will benefit no one except Illya, who is right behind him on the promotions list.

Section III: Enforcement and Intelligence
These are the armed, active-duty field agents, including all "junior" enforcement agents. Intelligence also controls couriers and similar functionaries.

Section IV: Intelligence and Communications
This is the beginning of the support personnel sections. Any agent who works at a computer terminal or provides information for the field agents is a member of this section.  As with such organization as the C.I.A. and NSA, U.N.C.L.E. maintains a staff of trained analysts who evaluate everything from maps and strike photos to data obtained in a raid.

Section V: Communication and Security
Given the global responsibilities of U.N.C.L.E., communications is a key supportive function.  Security overlaps, providing guards for such things as field meetings, including the "Summit Five" conference attended yearly by Waverly and the other Section Heads.

Section VI: Security and Personnel
Internal security is the responsibility of this section, supplying the various internal guards and also conducting the "sanitizing" or "clean-up" operations after a field operation - including the removal of bodies, which would attract unwanted police attention and prove very hard to explain.  Those who handle basic personnel matters (like hiring and medical insurance processing, among other normal business functions) are also members of this section.

Section VII: Propaganda and Finance
The Propaganda section is located on the third floor of the whitestone building adjacent to the N.Y. headquarters and functions as U.N.C.L.E.'s public "front" as one of the "think tanks" common in New York and Washington and also houses a charity fundraising organization.  It is part of this section's job to see to it that the public never sees the very secret face of the real U.N.C.L.E.

Section VIII: Camouflage and Deception
Known more colloquially as "The Lab."

Origins
According to The Cloak and Swagger Affair, a documentary about the making of the series included with the 2007 DVD release, the producers of The Man from U.N.C.L.E. originally intended to leave the meaning of the U.N.C.L.E. acronym a mystery. The meaning of THRUSH was never revealed in the seriesalthough the 4th book, "The Dagger Affair", in The Man from U.N.C.L.E. paperback series postulated that THRUSH stood for the "Technological Hierarchy for the Removal of Undesirables and the Subjugation of Humanity". The documentary states that after a protest from the [United Nations], which did not want to be connected to a fictional organization (such as, for example, "United Nations Criminal Law Enforcement"), the writers came up with a meaning that also became part of the series' trademark closing credit, thanking the United Network Command for Law and Enforcement for its cooperation with the producers of The Man from U.N.C.L.E.  Other sources credit producer Sam Rolfe as originally intending that U.N.C.L.E. be identified as an arm of the United Nations ("Behind that door is a man who reports only to the Secretariat of the United Nations!" supposedly was part of his network pitch).  As noted above, this idea was discarded for reasons still debated.

References

External links 
 The Man From U.N.C.L.E., Interlingua
 The Man from U.N.C.L.E. website
 Interview with Jon Burlingame – the producer of the four volume CD set of the original television and film soundtrack

Fictional intelligence agencies
The Man from U.N.C.L.E.